Heliodoxa is a genus of hummingbirds in the family Trochilidae.

Taxonomy
The genus Heliodoxa was introduced in 1850 by the English ornithologist John Gould. The genus name combines the Ancient Greek hēlios meaning "sun" and doxa meaning "glory" or "magnificence". The type species was subsequently designated by Charles Lucien Bonaparte as the violet-fronted brilliant.

The genus contains ten species:
 Gould's jewelfront, Heliodoxa aurescens
 Brazilian ruby, Heliodoxa rubricauda
 Fawn-breasted brilliant, Heliodoxa rubinoides
 Violet-fronted brilliant, Heliodoxa leadbeateri
 Velvet-browed brilliant, Heliodoxa xanthogonys
 Black-throated brilliant, Heliodoxa schreibersii
 Pink-throated brilliant, Heliodoxa gularis
 Rufous-webbed brilliant, Heliodoxa branickii
 Empress brilliant, Heliodoxa imperatrix
 Green-crowned brilliant, Heliodoxa jacula

References

 
Hummingbirds
Taxonomy articles created by Polbot